Padegan-e Sadkorkheh (also Romanized as Pādegān-e Sadḵorkheh) is a village in Karkheh Rural District, Hamidiyeh District, Ahvaz County, Khuzestan Province, Iran. At the 2006 census, its population was 1,844, in 550 families.

References 

Populated places in Ahvaz County